Gangtokey Gondogol (Trouble in Gangtok) is a short novel by Satyajit Ray featuring the private detective Feluda. This story was first published in the Desh magazine in 1970 and then published in book form in 1971 by Ananda Publishers.

Plot
Feluda and Topshe travel to Gangtok for their summer holidays at the start of the Bengali new year. While eating breakfast at the Bagdogra Airport, they meet a man named Sasadhar Bose, who works for a chemical firm dealing with  aromatic perfumes. He tells that he had attended a nephew's wedding in Ghatshila and had come to visit Sikkim. While stopping at a place called Teesta Bazaar, the trio learns of an accident which occurred on the North Sikkim Highway. They learn that a huge boulder had hit a taxi and the taxi had fallen off a cliff. But the driver had escaped unhurt. Feluda and Topshe are staying at Hotel Snow View while Sasadhar Bose is staying at the dak bungalow.

In the evening, Sasadhar Bose comes to Feluda's hotel and informs him that the man who fell down the cliff in the accident, was his partner Shivkumar Shelvankar, who was also the owner of the company. Sasadhar Bose walks out of the hotel to find a flight to Bombay the next day. Feluda meets another Bengali in the hotel, Nishikanto Sarkar. He reveals that he had a statue of a Tibetan God named Yamantak, which had nine heads and 34 hands. He says that he had sold the statue to Shelvankar for a 1000 rupees. While walking on the road, they meet a German hippie, Helmut Ungar, who tells them more about Shelvankar. He tells them that he had a son, whom he loved. But the son ran away from his father. Helmut tells Feluda that on the day of the accident, Mr. Shelvankar and he had decided to travel to a gumpa on the way to Singik. But Helmut had changed his mind and left early to take some photographs. He reveals to Feluda that  Shelvankar used to keep the statue with him in his breast pocket as he considered it to be a lucky charm. But after the accident, the statue was nowhere to be found. Helmut also tells that the reason of this superstition is because of the advice of a certain Dr. Vaidya.

Later in the evening, Feluda and Topshe go to the Tibetan Institute to learn more of the statue. Feluda asks the driver of the taxi he is travelling in, to come in the morning the next day because he wants to see the scene of the accident. They reach the Tibetan Institute, where the curator declares that the Yamantak which Shelvankar had would actually cost a little more than 10000 rupees. Feluda returns to the hotel to find Bose waiting for him. Bose tells Feluda that tomorrow he will be leaving for Bombay.

Next day, Nishikanto Sarkar tells Feluda that someone threw a paper note in his room. The paper consisted of a Tibetan word, which simply meant death. Later Feluda and Topshe travel to the accident site. There Feluda finds a white button. He also reveals that someone had tried to make the boulder fall by using a strong rod and that this accident was nothing but a well-planned murder. Feluda sends a telegram to Bose asking him to come back to Gangtok. The next day, Nishikanto Sarkar, Helmut Ungar, Topshe and Feluda travel to Rumtek for seeing the lama dance. Feluda learns, through a telegram, that Shelvankar's estranged son is present in a Sikkim monastery and a detective agency has found him. Then, Feluda hears someone shouting. He and Topshe come to the source of the sound and find that Mr. Sarkar had been pushed down the cliff. They rescue him and they come back to Gangtok. In the evening, they come to the dak bungalow, where Helmut is staying. There they meet a strange looking man. Helmut introduces him as Dr. Vaidya.

Dr. Vaidya, who specializes in talking to souls of the departed, tells all of them (through Shelvankar's spirit) that he was murdered and Virendra is responsible for his death. Helmut tells that Virendra is Shelvankar's only son. Dr. Vaidya tells Feluda that tomorrow he will be traveling to Pemayangtse. Next morning, Topshe finds a paper near Feluda's ashtray. The paper consisted of the same Tibetan word, meaning death. Feluda tells Topshe that today he will conduct an experiment on the North Sikkim Highway. After conducting the experiment, Feluda concludes that the murder was done by first hitting Shelvankar with a rod and then throwing the vehicle down the cliff. Then, a boulder was thrown to make it look like an accident. The driver was bribed. While Feluda was telling this, a boulder comes crashing down. Topshe saves Feluda from being crushed.

In the evening, Helmut comes to Feluda's room and shows him two photographs taken during the crime. It shows a man wearing red clothes standing on top of the mountain and seeing the car falling down. When Feluda tells that is that man Virendra, Helmut tells that it is impossible because he is only Virendra. He tells Feluda and Topshe that he did not like his father marrying twice and thus ran away from home. Then his father approached a detective agency to find his son. Then Helmut (or Virendra) came to Sikkim. Helmut tells Feluda that he suspects Dr. Vaidya being the murderer. They decide to travel to Pemiangchi to apprehend Dr. Vaidya. They pull in Mr. Sarkar also. Next day, while travelling to Pemayangtse, Sasadhar Bose also follows them and requests them to take him also. They reach there in the evening. There they find that Dr. Vaidya is not there but he had left his stick in the dak bungalow.

Feluda then announces that Sasadhar Bose is the killer. He killed Shelvankar to take over the ownership of the company. When Bose says that he had gone to his nephew's wedding during the murder, Feluda reminds him that in the Bengali calendar no wedding is held during the month of Choitro since it is an inauspicious month and that they had come together to Sikkim during the starting of the month of Baishakh, the first month of the Bengali calendar. Feluda tells that that Sasadhar Bose and Dr. Vaidya are the same person. Dr. Vaidya told Shelvankar of his own life and impressed him. While going to the gumpa, Dr. Vaidya and Shelvankar travelled in the same car. Then Dr. Vaidya/Sasadhar Bose hit Shelvankar with a rod and murdered him. Then he came back to Kolkata. Then as Sasadhar Bose, he travelled in the same plane with Feluda. Dr. Vaidya tried to put the blame on Virendra, although he did not know that Helmut was actually Virendra. When he saw that Feluda was conducting an investigation, he tried to kill Feluda. Feluda also tells that Mr. Sarkar wanted to steal the statue of Yamantak from Shelvankar. So after the murder, he came down to find the statue, But Bose saw him and started harassing him. Bose tries to escape but is caught by leeches. Feluda finds the statue in the belongings of Sasadhar Bose. Sasadhar Bose is arrested and Feluda solves one of his most complex cases.

Characters
 Prodosh Chandra Mitter aka. Feluda
 Tapesh Ranjan Mitter aka. Topshe
 Sasadhar Bose/Dr. Vaidya
 Nishikanto Sarkar
 Helmut Ungar/Virendra Shelvankar
 Shivkumar Shelvankar
 The curator of the Tibetan Institute

Adaptation
Director Sandip Ray revealed, the sequel to Badshahi Angti will be based on Gangtokey Gondogol. But the plan was shelved.

This story was adapted by Sunday Suspense, a Bengali radio programme, where Sabyasachi Chakraborty played the role of Feluda, while Topshe was played by RJ Deep. Various other roles were played by RJ Mir, RJ Pushpal and other artists.

References

1971 novels
Feluda (series)
Novels by Satyajit Ray
Novels set in India
1971 Indian novels